Talish-i Gushtasbi is the historical name of the northern Talish area, presently a part of the Republic of Azerbaijan. During the Abbasid Caliphate, there was a (partially equivalent) region called Gushtasfi. People of northern Talysh are of Iranian stock and speak a northwestern Iranian language called Talysh. The chief cities of the mentioned area are Lankaran, Lerik, Masally and Astara. Talysh language speaking people lives mainly in Astara (most of population), Lerik (great part of population), Lankaran (little more than half of population), and in Masally constitutes only small part of population.
Divided regions

See also
 History of Talysh
 Talysh-Mughan Autonomous Republic
 The National Talysh Movement
 Storming of Lankaran

References

 Бартольд В.В. Место прикаспийских областей в истории мусульманского мира. Баку. 1924.
 Минорский В.Ф. История Ширвана и Дербенда X XI веков. М., 1963.
 Агеев Г. Д., Квачидзе В. А. Разведки на западном побережье Каспийского моря // Археологические открытия 1970 года. — М.: Наука, 1971.
 Квачидзе В. А., Мамедов Р. А. Гидроархеологические исследования поселения Бяндован // Археологические открытия 1971 года. — М.: Наука, 1972.
 Квачидзе В. А. Подводная экспедиция на городище Бяндован // Археологические открытия 1975 года. — М.: Наука, 1976.
 A Mongol Decree of 720/1320 to the Family of Shaykh Zāhid  / Vladimir Minorsky

Geography of Azerbaijan
History of Talysh